Petra Schürmann-Freund (15 September 1933 – 14 January 2010) was a German actress, model, TV announcer and beauty queen who won Miss World 1956.

Biography

Schürmann won the 1956 Miss World contest, representing West Germany. 

 she is the only German to win this title, with the exception of Gabriella Brum who won the title in 1980 but resigned one day later. The pageant was held in London, United Kingdom. Schürmann finished only third in the Miss Germany pageant, but was chosen to represent her country in London because of her better knowledge of English.

At that time Schürmann was studying philosophy and history of the arts at the universities of Bonn and Cologne. After winning her Miss World title, she continued her studies in Munich. Beginning with the 1960s Schürmann entered an ongoing radio and television career, primarily with the Munich-based Bayerischer Rundfunk. She also did some acting and wrote several books.

Personal life
In 1973, Schürmann married the physician Dr. Gerhard Freund (1922–2008), who under a veil of secrecy, had fathered their daughter Alexandra in 1967. 

This was at a time when he was still wed to German actress Marianne Koch. Alexandra Freund also had a successful career with the Munich broadcaster but died in 2001, aged 34, from an automobile accident when she collided with a wrong-way driver.

Schürmann never fully recovered from the loss of her daughter, with whom she was very close. From 2003 until her death, she was involved in an intimate relationship with Felix Raslag, CEO of a biotech company in Munich, who was 35 years her junior.

Death
Schürmann retired in 2006 with her husband to their house on the shores of Lake Starnberg, south of Munich. When he died in August 2008, they had been married for 35 years. She died on 14 January 2010 in her home in Starnberg following a long illness.

Selected filmography
 Hot Pavements of Cologne (1967)
 The Body in the Thames (1971)

References

External links
 
 
 Article in Stern magazine – richly illustrated 
 

1933 births
2010 deaths
People from Mönchengladbach
People from the Rhine Province
Miss World winners
German television presenters
Miss World 1956 delegates
German film actresses
German television actresses
German beauty pageant winners
20th-century German actresses
German women television presenters
ARD (broadcaster) people
ZDF people
Bayerischer Rundfunk people